To Walk with Lions is a 1999 film directed by Carl Schultz and starring Richard Harris as George Adamson and John Michie as Tony Fitzjohn. It follows the later years of Lion advocate Adamson.

After his marriage to Joy Adamson of Born Free fame, Adamson spent the latter part of his life  protecting the lions and other wildlife in the Kora National Reserve, Kenya. He encounters poachers and government corruption blocking his quest for wildlife preservation.

Plot
Tony Fitzjohn (John Michie) has just come to work on Kora, a lion preserve, for two elderly brothers, George and Terrence Adamson (Ian Bannen). On his first day, Fitzjohn ignores George's advice not to run and is nearly mauled. Being informed this is how the last person to fill his position died, Fitzjohn writes the whole place off as crazy and decides to leave. After a last minute change of heart, and a lion cub brought in from a zoo for him to train and reintroduce into the wild, he discovers his life's true calling.

Years pass and Kora's lions are being picked off by herdsmen one by one with bullets and poison and the elephants and rhinos are being poached at an alarming rate for their tusks and horns. The Adamson brothers are expending all of their energies in protecting the wildlife but can hardly compete; as Fitzjohn observes “A ranger may make 800 shillings a month but a poacher will pay him 10,000 just to turn his back for a day”. The odds seem to be insurmountable as the poachers pile in and the animal death toll rises, while the local government decides that it does not really want a wildlife preserve at all.

Cast
Richard Harris as George Adamson
Ian Bannen as George's brother Terrence Adamson
John Michie as Tony Fitzjohn
Honor Blackman as Joy Adamson
Kerry Fox as Lucy Jackson
Hugh Quarshie as Hugh
Geraldine Chaplin as Victoria Anrecelli

Streaming 
In November 2019 the film was released online on the Canada Media Fund's Encore+ YouTube channel.

External links

George Adamson Website featuring photos, letters and much information on George Adamson.
George Adamson Wildlife Preservation Trust
Born Free Foundation website

1999 films
Films set in Kenya
Films based on non-fiction books
Films directed by Carl Schultz
1990s English-language films